Sayed Mahmoudpour Roudsari (born 11 October 1939) is an Iranian boxer. He competed in the men's welterweight event at the 1964 Summer Olympics.

References

1939 births
Living people
Iranian male boxers
Olympic boxers of Iran
Boxers at the 1964 Summer Olympics
Place of birth missing (living people)
Welterweight boxers
20th-century Iranian people